The Bucaramanga-Santa Marta Fault (BSMF, BSF) or Bucaramanga-Santa Marta Fault System is a major oblique transpressional sinistral strike-slip fault (wrench fault) in the departments of Magdalena, Cesar, Norte de Santander and Santander in northern Colombia. The fault system is composed of two main outcropping segments, named Santa Marta and Bucaramanga Faults, and an intermediate Algarrobo Fault segment in the subsurface.

The fault system is a major bounding fault for various sedimentary basins and igneous and metamorphic complexes. The northern Santa Marta Fault segment separates the Sinú-San Jacinto Basin and Lower Magdalena Valley in the west from the Sierra Nevada de Santa Marta to the east. The buried Algarrobo Fault segment forms the boundary between the Lower Magdalena Valley and northern Middle Magdalena Valley to the west and the Cesar-Ranchería Basin in the east. The Bucaramanga Fault segment separates the middle part of the Middle Magdalena Valley in the west from the Santander Massif in the east.

The fault system bounds and cuts the four largest terranes of the North Andes Plate; the La Guajira, Caribbean and Tahamí Terranes along the Santa Marta section and intraterrane movement in the Andean Chibcha Terrane. Studies of the fault segments have shown the fault was active in the pre-Columbian era, around the year 1020, when the area around Bucaramanga was inhabited by the Guane. Various seismic events analysed to have occurred during the Holocene of the Bucaramanga Fault segment lead to the conclusion the fault is active.

Description 
The Santa Marta Fault forms the boundary between several distinct geological provinces: it is the western limit of the Santa Marta Massif with the Sinú-San Jacinto Basin, farther to the south the fault separates the Lower Magdalena Valley and northern Middle Magdalena Valley from the Cesar-Ranchería Basin. The Santander Massif is separated from the central part of the Middle Magdalena Valley along the southern Bucaramanga Fault segment of the fault system.

The fault divides the northern part of the Eastern Ranges in two structurally distinct regions. The Andean uplifted eastern block mainly comprises  crystalline igneous and metamorphic rocks of Paleozoic and pre-Cambrian age, with lesser amounts of Jurassic, Triassic and Tertiary sedimentary rocks. In the western downthrown block, predominately sedimentary rocks of Quaternary and Tertiary age are found, with lesser amounts of Cretaceous and Jurassic rocks. The northern half of the fault is partially covered by Quaternary deposits in the Cesar and Magdalena valleys.

Segments 
The fault is divided into three segments; the main Bucaramanga Fault segment in the south, the Algarrobo Fault in the central section, and the main Santa Marta Fault segment in the northern part of the fault system. Between the two main outcropping segments, the Algarrobo Fault is present in the subsurface, overlain by Quaternary sediments. The urban centre of the major coal producing municipality El Paso, Cesar is located right above the fault. The fault reappears at surface east of Tamalameque, Cesar, where it continues south-southeastward into the Eastern Ranges in the departments of Norte de Santander and Santander. The fault can be traced until San Andrés, Santander. The Bucaramanga Fault possibly continues as the compressional Boyacá and Soapaga Faults on the Altiplano Cundiboyacense.

Municipalities

Tectonic setting 

The Bucaramanga-Santa Marta Fault system is located in northwestern South America, on the North Andes Plate, where the /yr east to southeastward moving Caribbean, /yr eastward subducting Malpelo, and South American Plates converge. Since Early Mesozoic times, the western portion of Colombia was subjected to different episodes of subduction, accretion and collision, at the boundaries of the South America continental and the oceanic Farallon, Nazca, and Caribbean Plates and various island arcs. The interaction of the plate tectonic movements formed the Northern Andean Block, separated from the Maracaibo Block by the Bucaramanga-Santa Marta Fault. The Northern Andean Block is subdivided into tectonic realms, with the Bucaramanga-Santa Marta Fault separating the Central Continental Sub-plate Realm in the west from the Maracaibo Sub-plate Realm in the east. It has been suggested that these two realms are dominated by respectively Nazca and Caribbean Plate subduction. The compressional stress regime caused the formation of the oblique sinistral Bucaramanga-Santa Marta Fault and dextral Oca and Boconó Faults.

The interplay between the Santa Marta and Oca Faults produced offshore Caribbean platforms and valleys north of the Sierra Nevada de Santa Marta near Taganga. Uplift along the western margin of the Santa Marta Fault probably commenced in the Pliocene.

The Bucaramanga Fault intersects with the Boconó Fault at the Santander Massif. The slab section, called Bucaramanga slab, here has a dip that continues to the oceanic crust of the Caribbean seafloor.

Activity 

A study published in 2009 about the Bucaramanga segment of the fault system revealed that the fault had eight episodes of activity during the late Holocene. The most recent activity has been inferred to have been around the year 1020. During this pre-Columbian era, the area around Bucaramanga was inhabited by the indigenous Guane. The authors consider the Bucaramanga Fault therefore as active.

Other faults in the seismically active zone, named Bucaramanga Nest, produced 27 earthquakes of magnitudes 4.0 to 5.3 between May 2012 and January 2013.

Panorama

See also 

 List of earthquakes in Colombia
 Cesar-Ranchería Basin
 Middle Magdalena Valley
 Taganga

Notes and references

Notes

References

Bibliography

Maps 
 
 
 
 
 
 
 
 
 
 
 
 
 
 
 

Seismic faults of Colombia
Strike-slip faults
Active faults
Faults
Faults
Faults
Faults
Earthquakes in Colombia
Faults